Juan Pérez Floristán (born in 1993) is a Spanish classical pianist.

Biography and career 
He was born in Seville in 1993. He has been in contact with important personalities of the music world, both in Spain and abroad: Daniel Barenboim, Elisabeth Leonskaja, Ferenc Rados, Claudio Martínez-Mehner, Menahem Pressler, Ana Guijarro and Ralf Gothóni. As student of Reina Sofía School of Music, he trained under Galina Eguiazarova. After that, he went on to continue his studies at Hanns Eisler School of Music in Berlin with Eldar Nebolsin, a former student of Reina Sofía School of Music himself.

Juan Pérez Floristán won the first prize and audience award of the 2015 Paloma O'Shea Santander International Piano Competition in Spain.

In 2018 he won the first prize of the Kissinger Klavierolymp (Kissingen Piano Olympics) in Germany.

In May 2021 won the first prize of the Arthur Rubinstein International Piano Master Competition, which took place in Tel Aviv.

References

External links
  Shostakovich Piano Concerto No. 2.
  Rachmaninoff Piano Concerto No. 2 during the finals of the 2015 Paloma O'Shea Santander International Piano Competition, with the Spanish Radio Television Symphony Orchestra.

Prize-winners of the Paloma O'Shea International Piano Competition
Living people
Spanish classical pianists
Male classical pianists
1993 births
21st-century classical pianists
21st-century male musicians
Spanish male musicians